No. 184 Squadron was a Royal Air Force squadron during the second world war.

History
No.184 Squadron was formed at RAF Colerne on 1 December 1942, as a fighter bomber unit equipped with the Hawker Hurricane. Initially, Mark IIDs with 40mm anti-tank cannon were received and the squadron trained with the Army in ground attack practice guns, bombs and rockets, replaced the IIDs and rockets became the main anti-tank weapon used by the Second TAF. Attacks on enemy shipping began on 17 June 1943 and cross-channel operations became No.184's main task.

In October 1943, four Spitfires were received for conversion training but in December it was the Typhoons which replaced the Hurricanes. With these the squadron, under the command of Jack Rose, began a series of attacks on enemy communications in preparation for the invasion. On 27 June 1944, the squadron moved to Normandy and supported the 21st Army Group throughout the battle of Normandy and the subsequent advance to the Netherlands by attacking enemy tanks and transport. After spending the winter in the Netherlands, it moved to Germany on 21 March 1945, claiming to be the first squadron based on German soil during World War II.

Ground support was continued right up until the end of the war until 184 was disbanded on 10 September 1945 at Flensberg in Germany

The Royal Air Force Church at St Clement Danes in London has the Queen's crown despite the squadron disbanding before Elizabeth II ascended to the throne.

Aircraft operated

References

External links

 Squadron history page on official RAF Website
 Air of Authority
  History of 184 Squadron with photos supplied by pilots and relatives

Military units and formations established in 1942
184 squadron